Singapore–Spain relations are the bilateral and diplomatic relations between these two countries. Singapore is accredited to Spain through its embassy in Paris, France and has two honorary consulates in Barcelona and Madrid. Spain has an embassy in Singapore.

Diplomatic relations 
Spain and Singapore established diplomatic relations on April 26, 1968. The Spanish Embassy in Singapore has been a resident since 2003. Previously, diplomatic relations were carried out from the Embassy in Indonesia. The Commercial Office was created in 1986. In 1999, a Regional Tourism Office was established.

Bilateral relations are therefore recent and focus on fostering greater exchange at all levels in order to strengthen the Spanish presence in this country and arouse greater interest in Spain in Singapore. Together with a program of trips and official visits and signing of bilateral agreements, the priority objectives are to achieve a greater economic presence in Spain, a greater visibility of our language and culture and the opening of a Singaporean Embassy in Madrid.

Until 2007, Singapore covered Spain from its Embassy in Paris. In that year he decided to appoint Ambassador Barry Desker, dean of the Nanyang Technological University and Director of the Institute for Strategic and Defense Studies, as Ambassador to Spain with residence in Singapore. Ambassador Desker presented credentials in January 2014.

Economic relations 
Singapore FDI in Spain is reduced with the exceptions of the years 2002 (60 million euros), 2008 (35 million euros) and 2014 (111 million euros). In 2013, there was an increase in the flow of investment with respect to recent years, reaching a value of 21.10 million euros.

Singapore represents the 42nd position of Spain's investment position in the world with a total of 726 million euros of investment stock, 0.19% of the total (2012). Singapore ranks 78th as an investor in Spain, 0.01% of the IDE (2012 data).

Cooperation 
Due to the high level of economic development in Singapore there is no presence of Spanish Cooperation.

See also
 Foreign relations of Singapore 
 Foreign relations of Spain

References 

 
Spain
Singapore